The imperial county of Holstein-Kiel was a line of the House of Schauenburg and Holstein from 1261 to 1390.

History 
The County of Holstein was ruled until 1238 by Adolphus IV of Schauenburg and Holstein. When he retired, his sons John I and Gerhard I ruled jointly in Holstein. In 1261 they divided the county, John taking Kiel and founding the line of Holstein-Kiel, and Gerhard taking Itzehoe and founding the Holstein-Itzehoe line.

In 1300 Holstein-Itzehoe was further divided into Holstein-Plön, Holstein-Pinneberg and Holstein-Rendsburg.

In 1350 the County of Holstein-Plön fell to the counts of Holstein-Kiel.

In 1390 the last Count of Holstein-Kiel, and hence of Holstein-Plön, died without issue. Both counties were inherited by the line of Holstein-Rendsburg.

Counts of Holstein-Kiel 
1261-1263 John I (1229 – 1263)
1263-1273 Adolphus V the Pomeranian (1252 – 1308), from 1273 Count of Holstein-Segeberg
1263-1316 John II the One-Eyed (1253 – 1321)
1316-1359 John III the Mild (ca. 1297 – 1359), from 1312 Count of Holstein-Plön
1359-1390 Adolphus VII (ca. 1329 – 1390), also Count of Holstein-Plön

Following the death of John I, his sons, Adolphus V and John II ruled Holstein-Kiel jointly. In 1273, they divided Holstein-Kiel, John II ruling from Kiel; Adolphus V ruling from Segeberg and founding the line of Holstein-Segeberg. When Adolphus V died in 1308 without a male heir, Holstein-Segeberg returned to Holstein-Kiel.

The successor of John II in 1316 was John III, a son of Gerhard II of Holstein-Plön.

After the death of Count Gerhard V of Holstein-Plön, a nephew of John III,  the Plön main line ended in 1350 and so John III took over the County of Holstein-Plön.

When Adolphus VII died without heirs in 1390, Holstein-Kiel and Holstein-Plön went into the hands of Count Gerhard VI of Holstein-Rendsburg.

Rise and fall of the county 

 
Kiel
Counties of the Holy Roman Empire
Holstein
Kiel